Mingyi Swa was a Burmese royal title, and may mean:

 Swa Saw Ke, King of Ava (r. 1367–1400)
 Mingyi Swa of Prome, Viceroy of Prome (r. 1446–82)
 Mingyi Swa, Heir-apparent of Burma (r. 1581–93)

Burmese royal titles